3430 or variant, may refer to:

In general
 A.D. 3430, a year in the 4th millennium CE
 3430 BC, a year in the 4th millennium BCE
 3430, a number in the 3000 (number) range

Other uses
 3430 Bradfield, an asteroid in the Asteroid Belt, the 3430th asteroid registered
 Texas Farm to Market Road 3430, a state highway

See also